Graphea paramarmorea is a moth of the family Erebidae first described by Travassos in 1956. It is found in Brazil.

References

Phaegopterina
Moths described in 1956